Michael Anthony Jones (born April 15, 1969) is an American football coach and former linebacker who is the wide receivers coach for the Birmingham Stallions of the United States Football League (USFL). He played college football at Missouri from 1987 to 1990. He played in the National Football League (NFL) for 13 seasons from 1991 to 2002 with his longest tenure as player with the Oakland Raiders. He played for three teams: the Los Angeles/Oakland Raiders, the St. Louis Rams, and the Pittsburgh Steelers, but is best known for making the game-saving tackle in Super Bowl XXXIV. He then served as the head coach of the Lincoln Blue Tigers (2011–2016).

College
Jones attended college at the University of Missouri, where he played running back. He set the school record for most career receptions by a running back with 72.

Playing career
Jones was undrafted in the 1991 NFL Draft, but signed with the Raiders as a rookie free agent, and switched to the linebacker position. Between his rookie and second seasons as a Raider, Jones played for the Sacramento Surge of the World League of American Football where he was the starting middle linebacker for the Surge team that won 1992 World Bowl II. He was the Raiders leading tackler in the 1995 and 1996 seasons.

Perhaps what Jones is remembered most for is what he did during the final play of Super Bowl XXXIV, which became known as The Tackle, when he tackled then-Tennessee Titans receiver Kevin Dyson at the one-yard line to preserve a Rams victory. During the 1999 regular season that year, he recorded one sack and four interceptions, which he returned for 96 yards and two touchdowns. He also recovered two fumbles, returning them for a combined 51 yards and one for a touchdown. Jones was cut by the Rams following the 2000 season as part of a salary cap purge of high priced veterans.

Jones then signed with the Steelers.

Jones finished his 12 seasons with nine sacks, eight interceptions, 132 return yards, five fumble recoveries, 94 return yards, and four touchdowns (two interceptions and two fumble recoveries) in 183 games.

Coaching
After retiring as a player, Jones spent six seasons coaching high school football at Hazelwood East High School in St. Louis, Missouri. He led the team to a state title as the head coach in 2008. In 2010, he coached the linebackers at Southern University in Baton Rouge, Louisiana. He was the head football coach at Lincoln University in Jefferson City, Missouri.
Jones is now the head coach at St. Louis University High School.
Jones was also on NFL Top 10's "Top Ten One Shot Wonders" at #10.

Head coaching record

 *Jones was fired by Lincoln prior to the fifth game.

References

External links
 Lincoln profile
 Just Sports Stats

1969 births
Living people
American football linebackers
Lincoln Blue Tigers football coaches
Los Angeles Raiders players
Missouri Tigers football players
Oakland Raiders players
Pittsburgh Steelers players
Sacramento Surge players
Southern Jaguars football coaches
St. Louis Rams players
Players of American football from Kansas City, Missouri
African-American coaches of American football
African-American players of American football
21st-century African-American people
20th-century African-American sportspeople
High school football coaches in Missouri
Birmingham Stallions (2022) coaches
Ed Block Courage Award recipients